Papilio liomedon, the Malabar banded swallowtail, is a member of the swallowtail butterfly family found in southern India. Earlier considered a subspecies of the banded swallowtail (Papilio demolion) of southeast Asia, it is now considered a distinct species.

Description
It is similar to Papilio demolion but distinguishable chiefly by the pale greenish-yellow band that crosses the wings starting from the middle and not from just before the middle of the dorsal margin of the hindwing, also this band is composed entirely of separate spots on the forewing.

Range
Western Ghats and hills of southern India. It is common (May to August) in Thenmala, Kollam district, south Kerala.

Status

The IUCN Red Data Book records the Malabar banded swallowtail as uncommon and not threatened as a species. However a survey in the early 1990s by Harish Gaonkar showed the butterfly to be rare but distributed from Kerala to Goa. The butterfly was considered to be common in Karwar in the past. It is not to be found in Maharashtra and Gujarat. It is protected by law in India.

Habitat
Generally found in the semi-evergreen and evergreen tropical forests of the Western Ghats where it flies mainly during the monsoon months.

Habits
The males are fond of heavy jungle especially on hilltops. The females fly lower in even thicker jungle. The butterflies visit flowers such as Lantana, Stachytarpheta and Clerodendrum.

Life cycle

There are two to three broods a year. Recorded in Kodagu (Coorg) as having broods from September to October, November to December, and, from April to May. Recorded in Karnataka in July and in September. Males appear to outnumber the females.

The life-history of this insect is given by Messrs. Davidson and Aitken: One of these gentlemen watched a female, P. liomedon, laying its eggs on a tender shoot of a small jungle tree or shrub (Acronychia laurifolia). There were "ten eggs, laid one on top of the other." Of the caterpillars which emerged five days after the eggs were laid, "five passed successfully through all dangers and became beautiful specimens, one female and four males. (This is one of the butterflies of which we rarely find females.) All through their lives these larvae continued gregarious, dispersing occasionally to feed, but always returning to rest side by side on the upper surface of a leaf. The following dates may be interesting. Eggs laid 2 August, hatched 7 August; skins cast (and eaten) 12 August; again 17 August; again 20 to 22 August. The most advanced cast its skin again on the 28th August, became a pupa on the 2nd of September, and emerged on the 15th of September. The others followed within two days. At first the larvae were of an oily yellow colour and bore many pairs of spiny points, but these disappeared with age and after the last moult there were only the short fleshy processes on the 2nd and last segment which characterise the group, and one additional curved pair on the ninth segment."
"The colour after the last moult was a clear slaty-blue, changing eventually to a greenish tint, with light brown markings very much the same as those which characterise the rest of the group. The pupa was more abruptly bent back from the middle of the thorax than that of P. erithonius (i. e. P. demoleus) and adorned on the thorax with a sword-shaped horn, fully three-eighths of an inch long, and always bent either to the right or the left. The colour was brown or green and yellow according to situation."

Eggs
The female lays her eggs one over the other in a stick of ten to sixteen. The orange eggs gradually fade to yellow. The pale black of the larval heads appear on the upperside of the eggs on the fourth day. The eggs hatch on the fifth day.

Larva
The larvae live gregariously and are heavily parasitized (up to 90%). The first instar lasts about five days, second instar for four days, third instar five, fourth instar four, about three days for the fifth instar and another three days for the sixth instar. They begin to pupate after around 22 days of their larval duration.

Pupa
The lower portion of the pupa is yellow or fluorescent green with purple lines. Between the head and the thorax region a projection like a jug-handle is seen. This is distinctive of the species. Below the thoracic region, two yellow spots are seen. The pupal duration is about 15 days.

Food plants
Acronychia laurifolia and Evodia roxburghiana of the family Rutaceae.

Cited references

Other references

See also
Papilionidae
List of butterflies of India
List of butterflies of India (Papilionidae)

liomedon
Butterflies of Asia
Butterflies described in 1874